A speaker pillow is a pillow that incorporates loudspeakers. It is generally designed as an alternative to headphones connected to portable media players.

Research has shown that a speaker pillow may also help with the symptoms of tinnitus by acting as a tinnitus masker, obscuring the internal sound with an external one. Studies have also found that speaker pillows may help some individuals with sleeping problems. The speaker pillow is generally used to play audio, such as relaxing music, radio shows or audiobooks, for an individual while falling asleep.

Speaker pillows come in two formats. One type contains a pouch for a smartphone from which audio is played. The other type has a small, flat speaker in the center of the pillow, which can be plugged into an audio device using a headphone jack. However, this type of speaker pillow is known to break very easily.

See also 

 Tinnitus masker

References
 Sleeping Gear Resource

Loudspeakers
Headphones
Pillows